Michaela Settle (born 1964) is an Australian politician. She has been a Labor Party member of the Victorian Legislative Assembly since November 2018, representing the seats of Buninyong and Eureka.

Early life
Settle was born in 1964 and grew up in regional Victoria: in Castlemaine and on her parents' farm near Ararat. After leaving school, she worked in the public relations sector before taking over the running of the family farm. She attended TAFE and Federation University, where she studied Professional Writing and Editing, before becoming marketing manager for Ballarat Community Health.

Political career
In 2017, Settle was pre-selected to replace the retiring member for Buninyong, Geoff Howard. At the 2018 Victorian state election, which saw a substantial swing to Labor across the state, she was elected with an increased margin, gaining 49.1% of first-preference votes. Her inaugural speech in the Legislative Assembly was on 20 February 2019.

Ahead of the 2022 Victorian state election, the seat of Buninyong as renamed Eureka following a significant shift in boundaries. Settle successfully re-contested the election.

Personal life
Settle lives in Ballarat and has two adult children.

References

Living people
Australian Labor Party members of the Parliament of Victoria
Members of the Victorian Legislative Assembly
Women members of the Victorian Legislative Assembly
21st-century Australian politicians
1964 births
21st-century Australian women politicians